Stanley Llewelyn Stennett  (30 July 1925 – 26 November 2013) was a Welsh comedian, actor and jazz musician.

Biography
Stennett was born in Pencoed, Bridgend. During World War II, he served in the army and also worked as an entertainer. He made his professional stage debut with a group called the Harmaniacs. In 1940, he became resident comedian on variety radio show, Welsh Rarebit, and he gained further success as one of the regular comedy guests on The Black and White Minstrel Show.

In the 1990s Stennett presented a country music show on Pontypridd Community Radio Station GTFM, having been introduced by former Valleys Radio/BBC presenter Steve Powell.

Television
Although primarily a comedian, who appeared in variety shows and pantomime throughout the UK, Stennett played "straight" acting roles in television programmes such as Coronation Street and Casualty. He was best known as Sid Hooper in the ITV soap opera, Crossroads, before taking a lease in 1980 on the Roses Theatre in Tewkesbury, Gloucestershire.

Stennett was a friend of Eric Morecambe, and hosted a show at The Roses that was to be Morecambe's final appearance, on 27 May 1984, immediately after which Morecambe died of a heart attack.

Stennett played trumpet and guitar. In his 80s he was still performing onstage. His autobiography, Fully Booked, was published in 2010.

Honours
Stennett was initiated into the exclusive fraternity, the Grand Order of Water Rats in 1959 and was a Fellow of the Royal Welsh College of Music & Drama.
He was awarded an MBE in the 1979 New Year Honours list, for services to entertainment and to charities.

Death
Stennett died at the University Hospital of Wales, in Cardiff on 26 November 2013, at the age of 88.

References

External links

1925 births
2013 deaths
British Army personnel of World War II
People from Bridgend
Male actors from Cardiff
Welsh male comedians
Welsh male soap opera actors
Welsh male stage actors
Welsh male television actors
Welsh jazz guitarists
British jazz trumpeters
Male trumpeters
Musicians from Cardiff
Members of the Order of the British Empire